Inferno Below is a 2003 Italian television miniseries directed by Antonio and Andrea Frazzi and starring  Claudio Amendola and Maria Grazia Cucinotta.

Plot

Cast 
 Claudio Amendola as Antonino
 Maria Grazia Cucinotta as Santina
 Elena Arvigo as Carmelina
 Francesco Siciliano as Turi Calò
 Gioele Dix as  Rodolfo Cammara
 Giorgio Gobbi as Nestore Venanzi
 Lorenza Indovina as  Angela Venanzi
 Luciano Scarpa as  Tano Lo Faro
 Mauro Marino as  Don Vito
 Pierfrancesco Poggi as  Toni Nardi
 Rolando Ravello as  Pino Calabrò
 Antonio Manzini as  Duilio
 Arturo Paglia as Michele Marino
 Wojciech Alaborski as  Lumbard
 Agnieszka Czekanska as Delanoi's Wife
 Maciej Damiecki as  Constantini

References

External links

2003 television films
2003 films
Italian drama films
Italian television films
2003 drama films
Films set in Belgium
Films scored by Luis Bacalov
Films directed by the Frazzi brothers
2000s Italian films